Matthias Legley (born 15 January 1991 in Waregem) is a Belgian cyclist riding for .

Major results
2016
 1st Stage 4 Tour de Tunisie
2017
 1st Overall Tour de Tunisie
 1st Stage 7 Tour du Cameroun
 1st Stages 3 & 7 Tour du Sénégal
 2nd Trophée de la Maison Royale, Challenge du Prince
 3rd Overall Tour de Côte d'Ivoire
1st Stage 1

References

1991 births
Living people
Belgian male cyclists
People from Waregem
Cyclists from West Flanders
21st-century Belgian people